Standings and results for Group 5 of the UEFA Euro 2004 qualifying tournament.

Group 5 consisted of Faroe Islands, Germany, Iceland, Lithuania and Scotland. Group winners were Germany, who finished four points clear of second-placed team Scotland who qualified for the play-offs.

Standings

Matches

Goalscorers

References
UEFA Page
RSSSF Page

Group 5
2002–03 in Scottish football
2003–04 in Scottish football
2002–03 in German football
Qual
2002 in Icelandic football
2003 in Icelandic football
2002 in Lithuanian football
2003 in Lithuanian football
2002 in Faroe Islands football
2003 in Faroe Islands football